State Route 196 (SR 196) is a  long north–south state highway in the western portion of the U.S. state of Ohio.

Route description
Along its way, SR 196 travels through the eastern part of Auglaize County and the southeastern portion of Allen County.  There is no portion of SR 196 that is included within the National Highway System (NHS).  The NHS is a system of routes deemed to be most important for the economy, mobility and defense of the country.

History
The debut of SR 196 took place in 1923.  Since its inception, the highway has maintained the same routing through eastern Auglaize and southeastern Allen Counties.

Major intersections

References

196
Transportation in Auglaize County, Ohio
Transportation in Allen County, Ohio